2016 Ventforet Kofu season.

J1 League

References

External links
 J.League official site

Ventforet Kofu
Ventforet Kofu seasons